Panther(s) Stadium may refer to:

 Panther Stadium, in Atlanta, Georgia, home of the Clark Atlanta University Panthers
 Panther Stadium (Birmingham–Southern), in Birmingham, Alabama, home of the Birmingham–Southern Panthers
Panther Stadium at Blackshear Field, in Prairie View, Texas, home of the Prairie View A&M Panthers
 Panthers Stadium, the commercial name of Penrith Stadium, Sydney
 Bank of America Stadium, in Charlotte, North Carolina, home of the Carolina Panthers American football team